The following are lists of world number 1 ranked players in tennis:

Men
World number 1 ranked male tennis players, all-time singles rankings
List of ATP number 1 ranked singles tennis players, since 1973
List of ATP number 1 ranked doubles tennis players, since 1976

Women
World number 1 ranked female tennis players, all-time singles rankings
List of WTA number 1 ranked singles tennis players, since 1975
List of WTA number 1 ranked doubles tennis players, since 1984

See also
Top ten ranked male tennis players
Top ten ranked male tennis players (1912–1972)
Top ten ranked female tennis players
Top ten ranked female tennis players (1921–1974)

 
1